Roridomyces mauritianus is a species of fungus in the genus Roridomyces, family Mycenaceae. It is found in Africa. The species was originally named Mycena mauritiana in 2001.

References

External links

Mycenaceae
Fungi of Africa
Fungi described in 2001